Newfound Harbor Key is a shallow coral reef located within the Florida Keys National Marine Sanctuary. It lies to the south of Big Pine Key, and north of Looe Key.  This reef is within a Sanctuary Preservation Area (SPA).

External links
 Benthic Habitat Map

References
 NOAA National Marine Sanctuary Maps, Florida Keys East
 NOAA website on Newfound Harbor

Coral reefs of the Florida Keys